The 2010 Chang-Sat Bangkok Open was a professional tennis tournament played on Hard court. It was the second edition of the tournament which is part of the 2010 ATP Challenger Tour. It took place in Bangkok, Thailand between 13 and 19 September 2010.

ATP entrants

Seeds

 Rankings are as of August 30, 2010.

Other entrants
The following players received wildcards into the singles main draw:
  Yuki Bhambri
  Peerakiat Siriluethaiwattana
  Dmitry Tursunov
  Danai Udomchoke

The following players received entry from the qualifying draw:
  Sebastian Rieschick
  Jun Woong-sun
  Bernard Tomic
  Gong Maoxin

Champions

Singles

 Grigor Dimitrov def.  Konstantin Kravchuk, 6–1, 6–4

Doubles

 Gong Maoxin /  Li Zhe def.  Yuki Bhambri /  Ryler DeHeart, 6–3, 6–4

External links
Pentangle Promotions official site
ITF Search 

 
 ATP Challenger Tour
Tennis, ATP Challenger Tour, Chang-Sat Bangkok Open
Tennis, ATP Challenger Tour, Chang-Sat Bangkok Open

Tennis, ATP Challenger Tour, Chang-Sat Bangkok Open